Drillia euphanes is a species of sea snail, a marine gastropod mollusk in the family Drilliidae.

Description
The length of the shell attains 12 mm, its diameter 5 mm.

(Original description) The fusiform, rather solid shell is white. It contains 8 whorls, of which two are in the protoconch, globular, white, smooth. The remainder are suturally impressed. They show regular incrassate nodulous longitudinal ribs, bluntly angled at the periphery. The nodules are large and shining. The ribs on the body whorl number eight or nine. These are crossed by somewhat coarse revolving lines, which, in the specimens before us, are nearly obsolete. The aperture is roundly-ovate. The sinus is rather wide and deep. The outer lip is slightly expanded. The columellar margin is fairly straight. The siphonal canal is very short.

Distribution
This species occurs in the Caribbean Sea off Cuba.

References

External links
 Neodrillia euphanes

euphanes
Gastropods described in 1923